Michael McIndoe (born 2 December 1979) is a Scottish football manager and former professional footballer. He is currently the sporting director and manager at Gretna 2008.

He has previously played for Derby County, Wolves, Coventry City, Bristol City, Luton Town, Yeovil Town, Hereford United, Doncaster Rovers, MK Dons, Barnsley, Clydebank and Stirling Albion.

McIndoe began his career at Luton Town where he made his home league professional debut at just 18 years old against Burnley on 5 September 1998. He has made 568 domestic league and cup appearances, scoring 92 goals. During his career McIndoe attracted in excess of £1million in transfer fees.

Known for his crossing, technical ability and speed, he was a proven goalscorer at every level including League Cup goals against Premier League clubs Manchester City, Arsenal and Aston Villa. While playing for Doncaster Rovers he set a record scoring ten penalties which was more than any player in the English Football League in the 2005/06 season.

McIndoe played twice for the Scotland B team, making his first appearance on 10 December 2003.

Club career

Luton Town 
McIndoe joined Luton Town as a youth in 1996 and was an integral part of an FA Youth Cup run, losing to eventual winners Leeds United in the semi-finals. Managed by coach John Moore, the team also won the youth league as well as the South East Counties League Cup final beating West Ham on 8 May 1998.

He made his professional home debut aged 18 against Burnley in 1998 winning 1–0. Over the course of the next two seasons McIndoe made 47 appearances. His talent was never in question but his off-field problems with alcohol addiction meant in December 1999, he was entered into the Priory. After discussions with manager Lennie Lawrence it was decided a new club would be the best for his career. Arsenal legend Paul Merson became McIndoe's sponsor helping him on his road to recovery. Former teammate Matthew Upson also played a huge part in advising McIndoe who would now focus on being the best athlete he could be and has been teetotal ever since.

Hereford United 
In July 2000 Hereford United manager Graham Turner signed McIndoe on a two-year contract. He made 30 appearances for the Bulls scoring 2 goals. His performances quickly put him on the radar of other Conference teams where a bidding war began between Boston United and Yeovil Town for McIndoe's signature. Hereford United eventually sold him to Yeovil Town for £25,000 retaining a 25% sell-on clause.

Yeovil Town 
Yeovil Town manager Colin Addison signed McIndoe on a three-year contract. He made a scoring debut for the Glovers on 17 February 2001, in a 2–1 win against Boston United. At the end of the 2000–01 season, the team just missed out on automatic promotion as they finished second.

Yeovil appointed Gary Johnson as the new manager for the 2001–02 season. They went on to have a successful campaign, winning the FA Trophy at Villa Park against Stevenage and finishing third in the Conference. At the age of 22, McIndoe captained the team on numerous occasions and picked up the club Player's Player of the Year award.

In the following 2002–03 season McIndoe made more appearances than any other player and was a key component in making club history, when Yeovil were crowned champions of the Nationwide Conference for the first time in 107 years. Yeovil remained unbeaten at home in the league all season. McIndoe was named in the Nationwide Conference Team of the Year and won the club's "Internet Player of the Season". He also became the first player in history to have all 24 Conference managers vote unanimously for the same player as Nationwide Conference Player of the Year. In two and a half years with Yeovil, McIndoe made 110 appearances and scored 25 goals.

Doncaster Rovers 
Doncaster Rovers signed McIndoe for £50,000 during the summer of 2003. He made his Rovers debut on 9 August 2003, in a 3–1 win against Leyton Orient. McIndoe scored his first hat-trick in a Football League match, scoring three times against Bristol Rovers in a 5–1 win on 4 October 2003. He also won the October Umbro Isotonic Player of the Month award. His performances earned him selection for the Scotland B team in December 2003. McIndoe's first season at Doncaster was very successful with the Rovers winning the Third Division (fourth tier) title. He was named Doncaster Rovers Player of the Year and was the only player in the championship winning side to be named in the PFA Team of the Year. To top off his season McIndoe was voted the PFA Player of the Year for the division.

In his second season with Rovers, in League One McIndoe was the club's top scorer with 12 goals. The Scottish winger was voted in the top five footballers of the year in The Times Football Yearbook 2004/05 alongside Thierry Henry, Wayne Rooney and Steven Gerrard.

Doncaster Rovers' League Cup run was the highlight of the 2005–06 season, beating Premier League sides Aston Villa and Manchester City with McIndoe scoring in both games. Rovers went on to face Arsenal on 21 December 2005 in the quarter-finals at Belle Vue. McIndoe opened the scoring in the fourth minute, beating goalkeeper Manuel Almunia from a tight angle. The game finished 2–2 after extra time, but Rovers missed three penalties as Arsenal moved on to the semi-finals. McIndoe went on to win December's League One Player of the Month award. In March 2006, Championship side Derby County moved in to sign McIndoe on a loan deal until the end of the season. For the second season running he finished as Rovers' top scorer with 13 goals (10 from penalty kicks), and was voted into the PFA Team of the Year for League One. McIndoe made 142 appearances for Doncaster Rovers, scoring 35 goals.

Derby County (loan) 
Derby County manager Terry Westley brought McIndoe in on loan in March 2006, as he tried to try to help keep the club in the Championship. McIndoe made his Derby debut on 11 March 2006, in a 3–0 win against Burnley. Within days of signing for Derby, McIndoe received his second call-up for the Scotland B team. McIndoe went on to play in all of Derby's remaining fixtures in the 2005–06 season, helping them to finish 20th and avoid relegation.

Barnsley 
In the 2006–07 pre-season, McIndoe signed for newly promoted Championship side Barnsley for £125,000. On 8 August 2006 he scored in his second match in a 3–2 win against Hull City. On 4 November 2006 McIndoe also scored in the Yorkshire derby against Leeds United, from outside the box with a low-driven shot. He scored 5 goals in 20 matches before Wolves made a £250,000 offer to Barnsley which was accepted in December 2006.

Wolverhampton Wanderers 
McIndoe signed a 3-year contract under manager Mick McCarthy. He scored his first goal for Wolves against Sheffield Wednesday away in a 2–2 draw. On a 22 April 2007 Wolves played Birmingham City in the West Midlands derby, McIndoe scored two headers but then missed a penalty in the last minute for a hat-trick, losing 3–2. Wolves finished 5th which saw them face rivals West Bromwich Albion in the play-off semi-finals. Albion beat Wolves 4–2 on aggregate over the two matches. Since joining Wolves he played in every match making 32 appearances, scoring 3 goals and numerous assists.

Bristol City

In July 2007, McIndoe signed a 3-year contract with Championship side Bristol City reuniting with manager Gary Johnson for an undisclosed fee believed to be in the region of £500,000. On 15 September 2007 he scored his first goal for the Robins in an away match against Coventry City winning 3–0. McIndoe helped Bristol City have a successful season finishing 4th. In the play-off semi-final against Crystal Palace, he scored a 30-yard free kick in extra-time taking Bristol City to their first Championship play-off final at Wembley Stadium against Hull City in front of almost 90,000. Dean Windass scored the winning goal for Hull City taking them into the Premier League. In his first season with the Robins, McIndoe made 49 appearances scoring 7 goals from midfield. Gary Johnson rewarded McIndoe with a new 3-year contract.

In the 2008–09 season McIndoe made 48 appearances scoring 6 goals finishing 10th in the Championship.

Coventry City
On 4 August 2009, Championship club Coventry City signed McIndoe on a 2-year contract under manager Chris Coleman for an undisclosed fee believed to be around £325,000. He received his third international call up against Japan in Yokohama, but the winger pulled out of the squad due to a minor knee injury. McIndoe played in numerous positions throughout the season, scoring 1 goal and making 43 appearances for the Sky Blues.

Aidy Boothroyd was appointed as the new Coventry City manager in May 2010. In his first match Boothroyd made McIndoe captain against Austrian side VF Gaflenz winning 2–0. Surprisingly under Boothroyd, McIndoe did not feature in many matches.

In 2010–11 McIndoe signed a short-term loan deal with the League One side Milton Keynes Dons to maintain his match fitness before returning to Coventry City in the Championship.

New appointed caretaker manager Andy Thorne put McIndoe straight back into the squad for the majority of the remaining matches in the 2010–11 season, where he played a part in helping Coventry City retain their Championship status. McIndoe's last professional appearance was against Middlesbrough on 25 April 2011. In July 2011 McIndoe left football to solely concentrate on his business career.

London Elite 
In the 2013–14 season McIndoe along with old Luton Town and MK Dons teammate Jude Stirling helped to coach young players at London Elite while playing alongside them. McIndoe secured pre-season friendlies against Oldham Athletic, AFC Telford United and Hertford Town. The team played in the Middlesex County League Central and East Division One and McIndoe played 12 games scoring 8 goals.

Clydebank
On 2 August 2018, McIndoe signed for Scottish Junior club Clydebank. He signed a short-term deal as a favour to manager Kieran McAnespie and coach Marc McCulloch, in return gaining match fitness preparing him to go back into the professional game. McIndoe made 9 appearances for the Bankies. On 3 October 2018, McIndoe was released by Clydebank.

Stirling Albion 
On 3 November 2018, McIndoe played for Stirling Albion under manager Kevin Rutkiewicz in a 3–0 win against Berwick Rangers. He played his last game for Stirling Albion against Annan Athletic in a 2–2 draw on 17 November 2018.

International career
McIndoe was selected twice by the Scotland B team.

Coaching career

Greta 2008 
On 24th May 2022 McIndoe was appointed as sporting director and assistant manager of Gretna 2008 After being given the caretaker manager role, in his first match, he led Gretna 2008 in a 3–1 win against Edinburgh University in the first round of the Scottish Cup. He was appointed as manager on 20 September 2022.

Business career
In 2011 McIndoe became the owner of Stamp private members club on 79 Oxford Street, London. He was also director of Huxley of London, a concierge service based in Mayfair. McIndoe was also involved in London Elite F.C. which was aimed at developing young talented footballers.

In October 2014, McIndoe was declared bankrupt with debts of £3 million. Several national newspapers have allegedly linked McIndoe to an 'investment scheme' but McIndoe has always strongly denied any allegation of wrongdoing. In December 2017, Scotland Yard completely cleared McIndoe in relation to the allegation in the national newspapers.

Personal career 
In September 2017 McIndoe released his first autobiography titled Wildling. It is a detailed account of his upbringing on the Calders Estate in Edinburgh, his professional football career and his nightclub on Oxford Street in London.

Career statistics

Honours 
Yeovil Town
 Nationwide Conference: 2002–03
 FA Trophy: 2001–02
 South East Counties League Cup: 1997–98

Doncaster Rovers
 Football League Division Three: 2003–04

Individual
 PFA Third Division Player of the Year: 2003–04
 Nationwide Conference Player of the Year: 2002–03
 Nationwide Conference Team of the Year: 2002–03
 Five Footballers of the Year, The Times Football Yearbook 2004–05
PFA Team of the Year: 2003–04 Third Division, 2005–06 Football League One
 Yeovil Town Players' Player of the Year: 2001–02
 Yeovil Town Player of the Year: 2002–03
 League One Player of the Month: December 2005
 Doncaster Rovers Player of the Year: 2003–04

References

External links

1979 births
Association football midfielders
Barnsley F.C. players
Bristol City F.C. players
Coventry City F.C. players
Derby County F.C. players
Doncaster Rovers F.C. players
Hereford United F.C. players
Living people
Luton Town F.C. players
Milton Keynes Dons F.C. players
Scotland B international footballers
Scottish footballers
Footballers from Edinburgh
English Football League players
Wolverhampton Wanderers F.C. players
Yeovil Town F.C. players
Scottish Junior Football Association players
Clydebank F.C. players
Stirling Albion F.C. players